Clingman Avenue Historic District is a national historic district located at Asheville, Buncombe County, North Carolina.  The district encompassed 33 contributing buildings in a historically African-American residential section of Asheville. It was largely developed in the early-20th century and includes representative examples of Queen Anne and Bungalow style dwellings.

It was listed on the National Register of Historic Places in 2004.

References

African-American history of North Carolina
Houses on the National Register of Historic Places in North Carolina
Historic districts on the National Register of Historic Places in North Carolina
Queen Anne architecture in North Carolina
Buildings and structures in Asheville, North Carolina
National Register of Historic Places in Buncombe County, North Carolina
Houses in Buncombe County, North Carolina